Modlin was a village near Warsaw in Poland near the banks of rivers Narew and Vistula. In 1961 it was incorporated into the town of Nowy Dwór Mazowiecki.

There is a former Modlin Fortress holding a junction of the two rivers, built in the 19th century, and last used during World War II. Currently, there is Modlin Airport in a part of the fortress.

See also
 Modlin Airport
 Nowy Modlin

References

External links

Villages in Nowy Dwór Mazowiecki County